Honduras is administratively divided into 18 departments which are subdivided into 298 municipalities. Municipalities are the only administrative division in Honduras that possess local government. Each municipality has its own elected mayor as opposed to the appointed governors of departments. For statistical purposes, the municipalities are further subdivided into 3731 aldeas, and those into 27969 caserios. At the lowest level, some caserios are subdivided into 3336 barrios or colonias.

List of municipalities

See also

References

External links
 
 

 
Subdivisions of Honduras
Honduras, Municipalities
Honduras 2
Municipalities, Honduras
Honduras geography-related lists